The Wild Frontier is an album by Randy Stonehill, released in 1986 on Myrrh Records.

Track listing
All songs written by Randy Stonehill and Dave Perkins except where noted.

Side one
 "The Wild Frontier" (Stonehill) – 4:07
 "Here Come the Big Guitars"  – 3:41
 "The Dying Breed"  – 4:15
 "Words on the Wind"  – 5:44
 "What's My Line"  – 3:47

Side two
 "What Do You Want from Life" (Stonehill) – 3:48
 "Get Together" (Chet Powers) – 3:50
 "Defender"  – 3:01
 "Evangeline" (Stonehill) – 5:38
 "The Hope of Glory" (Stonehill) – 4:48

Personnel 
 Randy Stonehill – vocals, acoustic guitar, electric guitars
 Reese "Mr. B-3" Wynans – keyboards
 Tom Howard – synthesizers, brass arrangements (10)
 Rob Watson – synthesizers
 Dave Perkins – synthesizers, acoustic guitar, electric guitars, bass guitar, percussion, backing vocals
 Peter Robb – programming
 Jerry Chamberlain – electric guitars, backing vocals 
 Jerry McPherson – electric guitars
 Rick Cua – bass guitar
 Mike Mead – drums 
 Keith Edwards – percussion
 Alex MacDougall – percussion
 John Lunden – horn contractor (10)
 Peter Case – backing vocals
 Gary Chapman – backing vocals
 Chris Harris – backing vocals
 Tonio K. – backing vocals
 Peter Noone – backing vocals

Production 
 Ray Ware – executive producer 
 Dave Perkins – producer, engineer, mixing
 David Schober – engineer, mixing 
 Randy Stonehill – mixing
 Malcolm Harper – additional engineer 
 Gene Ford – second engineer
 Matt Freeman – second engineer
 Dan Garcia – second engineer
 Jon Ingoldsby – second engineer
 Casey McMackin – second engineer
 Bob Salcedo – second engineer
 Mama Jo's (North Hollywood, California) – mixing location 
 Bernie Grundman – mastering at Bernie Grundman Mastering (Hollywood, California)
 Roland Young – cover art direction, design
 Howard Rosenburg – cover photography
 Sandi Stonehill – wardrobe, make-up, hair stylist

References

1986 albums
Wild Frontier, The